John "Jack" Ward was a Canadian professional ice hockey forward who was active in the early 1900s. Amongst the teams Ward played for were the Canadian Soo Algonquins, Michigan Soo Indians, Brantford Indians, Montreal Shamrocks and the Port Arthur Lake City. Despite his small stature, weighing only around 135 pounds, Ward was a prolific scorer in the IPHL, OPHL and the NOHL.

Ward was born in the city of Kenora in northwestern Ontario, then known as Rat Portage.

Statistics
Exh. = Exhibition games, NOHL = New Ontario Hockey League

Statistics per Society for International Hockey Research at sihrhockey.org

References

Notes

Canadian ice hockey centres
Sault Ste. Marie Marlboros players
Michigan Soo Indians players
Montreal Shamrocks players
Sportspeople from Kenora
Ice hockey people from Ontario
Year of death missing
Canadian ice hockey left wingers